Nyinahin is a small town and is the capital of Atwima Mponua, a district in the Ashanti Region of Ghana.

Transport 
It is proposed to have a railway station under the ECOWAS rail scheme.

See also 
 Railway stations in Ghana

References

Populated places in the Ashanti Region